The siege of the Hong Kong Polytechnic University occurred during the 2019–2020 Hong Kong protests on the campus of the Hong Kong Polytechnic University (PolyU).

The event was preceded by a similar conflict at the Chinese University of Hong Kong. It was precipitated by the setting-up of a roadblock at the Cross-Harbour Tunnel, next to the university. Protesters gathered at the university to defend the roadblock from attacks by the Hong Kong Police Force (HKPF). The police shot tear gas and used water cannons to shower the protesters with water containing blue colouring and chemical irritants. The protesters responded by throwing bricks and petrol bombs.

Thereafter, the police blocked different campus exits and forbade protesters from leaving. Police tried to drive an armoured vehicle into campus but the vehicle was hit by petrol bombs, forcing it to reverse. The police arrested people who claimed to be first-aid personnel, medical volunteers and reporters.

On 18 November the police shot 1,458 canisters of tear gas at protesters as well as 1,391 rubber bullets, 325 bean bag rounds, and 256 sponge grenades. On 19 November the city's hospitals were overwhelmed by the number of protesters needing urgent medical attention caused by the siege, and advised citizens not to use emergency rooms unless absolutely necessary.

17 November 
At around 10:00 am, some citizens attempted to clear the roadblocks between Austin Road and Chatham Road South, near Rosary Church. During their attempt to remove the obstacles in the road, protesters blocked their actions and prevented them from dismantling the roadblocks. During the confrontation, bricks were thrown towards the people clearing the obstacles. Riot police arrived at around 11:00 and confronted the protesters, firing tear gas and rubber bullets at them. The protesters responded by throwing bricks and petrol bombs. The situation deteriorated by the afternoon, where water cannons and armoured cars were used to breach the protesters' line. Blue-dyed water fired from the water cannons was continuously used, with the protesters fighting back with bricks and petrol bombs.

Around 9:00 pm, police publicly announced that anyone arrested inside Polytechnic University would face the charge of rioting, as would anyone who attempted to go in or help people inside. The police added that anyone inside the campus could peacefully leave via the exit at Y-core. However, those attempting to leave via the designated exit were instead arrested. Among the people arrested were university staff, reporters, social workers, volunteer first-aid personnel, doctors and nurses. Police claimed that protesters were disguising themselves as medical workers. Dr Arisina Ma, president of Hong Kong Public Doctors’ Association, criticised the police for arresting and detaining them for 24 hours and then forcing them to post bail instead of simply checking their professional identification and releasing them. Surgeon Darren Mann, who had witnessed medics being hogtied and who had telephoned both the Red Cross and Médecins Sans Frontières asking them to intervene, criticised the police for treating medical personnel like terrorists, stating: "The arrest of [active medical] personnel is almost unheard of in civilised countries and is incompatible with the compact of humanitarianism".

Polytechnic University authorities released a statement saying that protesters had damaged its laboratories and stolen dangerous chemicals. Subsequently, safety concerns mounted as the Chinese University, Polytechnic University, and City University also reported to police that chemicals – several of which are toxic, corrosive, or flammable, and deadly – had been stolen from their laboratories.

18 November 
Auxiliary Bishop of Hong Kong Joseph Ha and a number of pro-democracy legislators requested to meet the HKPF commander, hoping that the crisis could be settled in a peaceful way, but HKPF declined. Afterwards, pro-democracy legislators held a press conference and declared there was a severe humanitarian crisis happening inside Polytechnic University and demanded Hong Kong Chief Executive Carrie Lam speak up and end the crisis immediately to avoid any serious consequences.

At 9:00 am, an RTHK reporter preparing to relieve a colleague inside in accordance with procedures predetermined by the police went to the indicated place for swapping out. Riot police shouted at the journalist and ordered him to put his hands up while they checked his press ID and identity card. When the reporter claimed that he only wanted to go on duty, riot police refused to let him out and insisted that he had to leave by another route. He was escorted by the police as he was leaving. Other reporters of RTHK who passed the Cross-Harbour Tunnel and wanted to document the events unfolding at PolyU were likewise blocked and ordered to leave by the riot police. The police indicated that everyone inside PolyU would be charged with "participating in a riot".

At 11:00 am, the police fired tear gas towards Queen Elizabeth Hospital which injured some protesters and forced the hospital to suspend specialist services and to use plastic tape to seal its windows and doors.

19–27 November 

Riot police trapped protesters inside the university as the standoff continued, with students desperate to escape from campus. Some fled by ziplining from one of the university's bridges, or in some cases, through sewers. The protesters reportedly had 'no way to leave'. The number of protesters trapped inside the building was disputed, with police putting their number at around 80–100 while protesters claimed the number was around 200.

Throughout the following days, more protesters from PolyU surrendered to police. The siege continued into 23 November, with around 50 protesters remaining. The campus's hygiene quickly deteriorated, and the protesters inside reported being mentally and physically weak.

28–29 November: End of the siege 
Amid dwindling numbers of protesters in the university, the police entered on 28 November to look for stragglers and to clear the premises of hazardous materials. After a two-day search that failed to find any holdouts, the police lifted the cordon on 29 November. The university remained closed until the campus was deemed safe, even as petrol bombs and other weapons continued to be found on campus. More than 4,000 petrol bombs including about 600 tied to portable propane bottles were discovered. Around 1,300 people were arrested in and around PolyU over the course of the siege, and around 300 were sent to hospitals.

Rioting charges and convictions 
On 15 May 2020, 14 people were formally charged with rioting, while another remained wanted by the police. All of these protesters were originally arrested during a police dispersal operation at the campus on 18 November 2019. In addition to the rioting charges, five of the group were charged with other offences, including possession of an offensive weapon in a public place. On 15 January 2022, seven of the arrested were sentenced to jail terms between 38 and 40 months, while two who were 17 and 18 years old at the time of the offence were sent to a training centre. On 9 September 2022, a female student who had entered a guilty plea for rioting the preceding month was also sent to a training centre. On 11 February, Alvin Cheng was sentenced to three years and eight months in prison on a rioting charge added by prosecution mid-way through the trial; local media reported that seven others were sentenced to between 7 and 13 months for attempting to help protesters escape the besieged campus, three of whom had pleaded guilty to the perverting public justice charge.

Responses

Polytechnic University 
Teng Jin-guang, president of Polytechnic University, released a video early on 18 November to explain his disappearance and asked protesters to leave peacefully. In a video lasting 1:08 released by the Polytechnic University's Public Relations Department, he claimed that he had been communicating with police since the afternoon of 17 November and because the police did not suggest he go to the campus, he decided not to appear at the campus but instead release the video. He further claimed that police promised a temporary suspension on the use of force on condition the protesters will do the same. He also said police promised him that protesters could leave the campus peacefully and he himself would accompany any student to the police station and ensure their case will be fairly processed. Teng said that the government shall bear overall responsibility and claimed the university was a victim since only around 50 radical protesters were students from the university.

People's Republic of China 
Hu Xijin, the chief editor of Global Times, a Chinese state-owned tabloid, urged for protesters to be shot and advocated for immunity from charges for the police in the case of a fatal shooting.

United States 
Jim McGovern, a member of the United States House of Representatives, stated that the entire world was monitoring the situation in Hong Kong, that further violence would only worsen the situation, and asked for self-control by the Hong Kong Government.

United Kingdom 
Malcolm Rifkind, former UK Secretary of State for Foreign and Commonwealth Affairs, urged Hong Kong Chief Executive Carrie Lam to order the police not to use live ammunition.

Natalie Bennett, former leader of the Green Party of England and Wales said she had received many international-level requests, and asked the UK government to use all means to mediate the situation.

David Alton, a member of the House of Lords, stated that the bloodshed must stop, and Chief Executive Lam must take action immediately to stop the tragedy.

See also
2019 November Shooting Incident in Sai Wai Ho
Siege of the Chinese University of Hong Kong

References

External links 
 

2019–2020 Hong Kong protests
Hong Kong Polytechnic University
November 2019 events in China